Gamane Yaa (Sinhala: ගමනේ යා) is a 2021 Sri Lankan thriller teledrama broadcast by Sri Lanka Rupavahini, directed by Senaka Edirisighe, produced by Chandana Krishantha, and music composed by Tharaka Sandaruwan. It was released on 16, January 2021 and continues every weekend at 8:00 pm to 8:30 pm. Minneriya Army Infantry Training Center has been taken for the shootings. The teledrama indicates the lives style of army soldiers.

The serial stars Shanudrie Priyasad, Umayangana Wickramasinghe, Ramya Wanigasekara, Sarath Kothalawala, Dharmapriya Dias, and Palitha Silva.

Plot

Cast

Main
 Shanudrie Priyasad
 Palitha Silva
 Dharmapriya Dias
 Sarath Kothalawala
 Umayangana Wickramasinghe
 Ramya Wanigasekara

Supportive
 Madanee Malwaththage
 Susantha Chandramali
 Jehan Appuhami
 Dilini Lakmali
 Gamini Jayalath
 Suneth Priya
 Tharindi Fernando
 Asela Chathuranga
 Kusum Maldeniya
 Madeera Ushani
 Supun Senevirathne
 Thilan Warnajith
 Nadun Akalanka
 Amal Wickramasinghe

References 

Sri Lankan television shows
2021 Sri Lankan television series debuts
Sri Lankan television series
Sri Lanka Rupavahini Corporation original programming